M.P. Govindan Nair (April 1928 – 13 April 2022) was an Indian politician. A member of the Indian National Congress, he served in the Kerala Legislative Assembly from 1960 to 1964. He died on 13 April 2022, at the age of 94.

References

1928 births
2022 deaths
20th-century Indian politicians
Indian National Congress politicians from Kerala
Kerala MLAs 1960–1964
People from Kottayam district